Bravo Sports is a sporting-goods company based in Santa Fe Springs, CA.  Bravo manufactures lawn canopies under the brand names QuickShade, ShadeTech, MotoShade, EzUp, etc.  The canopies are branded under licenses from Marvel, John Deere, Disney, etc.  Bravo also manufactures Airzone trampolines.  A separate division manufactures skateboard and scooter parts and products under brand names such as Pulse Performance, Satellite, Maple, and Kryptonics.

The company was founded in 1997 by the CEO Leonardo Pais who merged his own company, Xero Wheels Sri (of Italy) with Kryptonics.  The company is privately-held and has an annual revenue of $10M - $20M US Dollars, with 51-200 employees.

References

External links

Skateboarding companies
Sporting_goods_manufacturers_of_the_United_States